Zubarevskaya is a rural locality (a village) in Rostovsko-Minskoye Rural Settlement of Ustyansky District, Arkhangelsk Oblast, Russia. The population was 3 as of 2010.

Geography 
Zubarevskaya is located 34 km south of Oktyabrsky (the district's administrative centre) by road. Zayachevskaya is the nearest rural locality.

References 

Rural localities in Ustyansky District